Ross 128 is a red dwarf in the equatorial zodiac constellation of Virgo, near β Virginis. The apparent magnitude of Ross 128 is 11.13, which is too faint to be seen with the unaided eye. It was first cataloged in 1926 by American astronomer Frank Elmore Ross.

Properties

This low-mass star has a stellar classification of M4 V, which places it among the category of stars known as red dwarfs. It has 15% of the mass of the Sun and 21% of the Sun's radius, but generates energy so slowly that it has only 0.033% of the Sun's visible luminosity; however, most of the energy being radiated by the star is in the infrared band, with the bolometric luminosity being equal to 0.36% of solar. This energy is being radiated from the star's outer atmosphere at an effective temperature of 3,180 K. This gives it the cool orange-red glow of an M-type star.

Ross 128 is an old disk star, which means it has a low abundance of elements other than hydrogen and helium, what astronomers term the star's metallicity, and it orbits near the plane of the Milky Way galaxy.  The star lacks a strong excess of infrared radiation. An infrared excess is usually an indicator of a dust ring in orbit around the star.

In 1972, a flare was detected from Ross 128.  It was observed to increase in brightness by about half a magnitude in the ultraviolet U band, returning to normal brightness in less than an hour.  At optical wavelengths, the brightness changes were almost undetectable.  It was classified as a flare star and given the variable star designation FI Virginis.  Because of the low rate of flare activity, it is thought to be a magnetically evolved star. That is, there is some evidence that the magnetic braking of the star's stellar wind has lowered the frequency of flares, but not the net yield.

Brightness variations thought to be due to rotation of the star and magnetic cycles similar to the sunspot cycle have also been detected.  These cause changes of just a few thousandths of a magnitude.  The rotation period is found to be 165.1 days, and the magnetic cycle length 4.1 years.

This orbit will bring the star closer to the Solar System in the future. The nearest approach will occur in approximately 71,000 years, when it will come within .

Planetary system

Ross 128 b was discovered in July 2017 by the HARPS instrument at the La Silla Observatory in Chile, by measuring changes in radial velocity of the host star. Its existence was confirmed on 15 November 2017. It is the second-closest known Earth-size exoplanet, after Proxima b. It is calculated that Ross 128 b has a mass of 1.8 times the Earth, a radius 1.6 times that of the Earth, and orbits 20 times closer to its star than Earth orbits the Sun, intercepting only about 1.38 times more solar radiation than Earth, increasing the chance of retaining an atmosphere over a geological timescale. Ross 128 b is a closely orbiting planet, with a year (orbital period) lasting about 9.9 days. At that close distance from its host star, the planet is most likely tidally locked, meaning that one side of the planet would have eternal daylight and the other would be in darkness. Near-infrared high-resolution spectra from APOGEE have demonstrated that Ross 128 has near solar metallicity; Ross 128 b therefore most likely contains rock and iron. Furthermore, recent models generated with these data support the conclusion that Ross 128 b is a "temperate exoplanet in the inner edge of the habitable zone."

Radio signals
In the spring of 2017, Arecibo astronomers detected strange radio signals thought to originate from Ross 128 that were unlike any they had seen before. SETI's  Allen Telescope Array was used for follow-up observations and was unable to detect the signal but did detect man made interference, making it seem clear that the Arecibo detections were due to transmissions from Earth satellites in geosynchronous orbit. Ross 128 has a declination (a coordinate which can be likened to latitude) of close to 0 degrees, which places it in the thick of a phalanx of these satellites.  Therefore, it can be concluded that the signal was a result of man-made interference.

See also
 List of nearest stars and brown dwarfs
 PSR B1919+21 – pulsar mistaken for an alien radio signal (LGM-1)

References

External links

 Astronomers heard “weird” signals from direction of Ross 128 (Skymania)
 SolStation.com: Ross 128

Local Bubble
M-type main-sequence stars
Virgo (constellation)
Flare stars
128
0447
057548
Virginis, FI
?
Emission-line stars
Orion–Cygnus Arm
Planetary systems with one confirmed planet
TIC objects